Reynaldo Navarro (born December 22, 1989) is a Puerto Rican former professional baseball second baseman. He played in Major League Baseball (MLB) with the Baltimore Orioles in 2015.

Career

Arizona Diamondbacks
Navarro was drafted by the Arizona Diamondbacks in the third round of the 2007 Major League Baseball Draft out of the Puerto Rico Baseball Academy.

Kansas City Royals
In 2010, he was traded to the Kansas City Royals for Carlos Rosa. Prior to the 2014 season he signed with the Cincinnati Reds.

Baltimore Orioles
Navarro signed a major league contract with the Baltimore Orioles on November 26, 2014. He was called up to the  major leagues on April 24, 2015. He collected his first major league hit, a double, and run during his debut. The very next game he went 3-5
with his first Big-League RBI, to help the Orioles defeat the Red Sox, 18-7. On May 13, 2015, in a game against the Toronto Blue Jays, Navarro hit his first major league home run off of relief pitcher Brett Cecil.

Los Angeles Angels
On December 23, 2015, the Los Angeles Angels of Anaheim claimed Navarro off waivers. Navarro signed a minor league contract with the Angels on November 23, 2016. He elected free agency on November 6, 2017.

Seattle Mariners
On January 16, 2018, Navarro signed a minor league deal with the Seattle Mariners. He was released on April 27, 2018.

Sugar Land Skeeters
On May 8, 2018, Navarro signed with the Sugar Land Skeeters of the Atlantic League of Professional Baseball.

New York Yankees
On May 11, 2018, Navarro signed a minor league deal with the New York Yankees. He elected free agency on November 2, 2018.

Somerset Patriots
On April 15, 2019, Navarro signed with the Somerset Patriots of the Atlantic League of Professional Baseball. He became a free agent following the season.

References

External links

1989 births
Living people
Arizona League Angels players
Atenienses de Manatí (baseball) players
Baltimore Orioles players
Criollos de Caguas players
Indios de Mayagüez players
Liga de Béisbol Profesional Roberto Clemente infielders
Louisville Bats players
Major League Baseball second basemen
Major League Baseball players from Puerto Rico
Missoula Osprey players
Norfolk Tides players
Northwest Arkansas Naturals players
Omaha Storm Chasers players
Orem Owlz players
Pensacola Blue Wahoos players
People from Caguas, Puerto Rico
Salt Lake Bees players
Scranton/Wilkes-Barre RailRiders players
Somerset Patriots players
South Bend Silver Hawks players
Sugar Land Skeeters players
Tacoma Rainiers players
Tigres de Aragua players
Puerto Rican expatriate baseball players in Venezuela
Trenton Thunder players
Visalia Rawhide players
Wilmington Blue Rocks players